Mariana Duque Mariño and Wang Yafan were the defending champions, but Duque Mariño has since retired from professional tennis and Wang chose not to participate.

Timea Bacsinszky and Mandy Minella won the title, defeating Cornelia Lister and Renata Voráčová in the final, 0–6, 7–6(7–3), [10–4].

Seeds

Draw

Draw

References

External Links
Main Draw

Croatian Bol Ladies Open
Bol Open - Doubles